Jennie Frances  Wåhlin (born 26 November 1997) is a Swedish curler from Huddinge. She is currently the alternate on Team Isabella Wranå. She won a gold medal at the 2018 Winter Olympics as alternate for the Anna Hasselborg team.

In 2018 she was inducted into the Swedish Curling Hall of Fame.

Career
Wåhlin played in the World Junior Curling Championships in 2014, 2015, 2017 and 2018 as a member of Team Isabella Wranå. In 2014, her team of Wranå, Elin Lövstrand, Almida de Val and Fanny Sjöberg had a fourth-place finish, after they lost in the bronze medal game to Russia. In 2015, she and teammates Wranå, Wåhlin, Johanna Heldin and Johanna Höglund again finished fourth after this time losing to Switzerland in the bronze medal game. She was back at the event in 2017 where her team won the gold medal, defeating Scotland's Sophie Jackson in the final, and lost just two round robin games in the process. The next year the same team went undefeated in the round robin, but ended up losing to Canada's Kaitlyn Jones in the final. This team also represented Sweden at the 2017 Winter Universiade, where they took home the bronze medal. Wåhlin represented Sweden one more time at the juniors in 2019 as second for Tova Sundberg. They placed sixth.

As World Junior champions, the Wranå rink qualified for the 2017 Humpty's Champions Cup, Wåhlin's first Grand Slam event. The team did not qualify for the playoffs but did win one game. The team won their first World Curling Tour event at the 2018 AMJ Campbell Shorty Jenkins Classic. A month later, they won the Paf Masters Tour. Over the course of the 2018–19 season, the team played in four slams, failing to qualify in any of the four. They won one game at the 2018 Tour Challenge, one game at the 2018 National, no games at the 2019 Canadian Open and one game at the 2019 Champions Cup. Also during this season, the team won the 2019 Winter Universiade.

Team Wranå had a successful 2019–20 season, winning two tour events (the Royal LePage Women's Fall Classic and the Paf Masters Tour once again) and finishing second at the Women's Masters Basel and the Glynhill Ladies International. They played in two slam events, winning one game at both the 2019 Tour Challenge and the 2019 National.

Due to the COVID-19 pandemic, Team Wranå only played in one tour event during the abbreviated 2020–21 season. The team competed at the 2020 Women's Masters Basel, where they missed the playoffs with a 1–2 record. In December, they played Team Hasselborg in the Sweden National Challenge, where they won by a score of 17–12. The Swedish Women's Curling Championship was cancelled due to the pandemic, so Team Hasselborg was named as the Swedish Team for the 2021 World Women's Curling Championship. After the season, longtime lead Fanny Sjöberg stepped back from competitive curling and Maria Larsson joined the team as their new lead.

In their first event of the 2021–22 season, Team Wranå reached the final of the 2021 Euro Super Series where they lost to Rebecca Morrison. They also reached the semifinals of the 2021 Women's Masters Basel before being eliminated by Denmark's Madeleine Dupont. After missing the playoffs at the 2021 Masters, Team Wranå made the playoffs at a Grand Slam event for the first time at the 2021 National before being eliminated in the quarterfinals by Kelsey Rocque. Elsewhere on tour, the team reached the semifinals of both the Red Deer Curling Classic and the International Bernese Ladies Cup. At the Swedish Eliteserien in February, the team defeated Tova Sundberg to claim the event title. They also beat Sundberg in the final of the 2022 Swedish Women's Curling Championship in March. Team Wranå wrapped up their season at the 2022 Players' Championship Grand Slam where they once again qualified for the playoffs. They then lost to Tracy Fleury in the quarterfinal round.

Aside from Team Wranå, Wåhlin has also been the alternate for the Anna Hasselborg rink. She has been to two world championships with them, winning a silver medal in 2018 and won an Olympic gold medal at the 2018 Winter Olympics. Wåhlin didn't play any games however.

Grand Slam record

Teams

References

External links

1997 births
Living people
Swedish female curlers
Olympic curlers of Sweden
Curlers at the 2018 Winter Olympics
Olympic gold medalists for Sweden
Medalists at the 2018 Winter Olympics
Olympic medalists in curling
Sportspeople from Stockholm
Universiade medalists in curling
Universiade gold medalists for Sweden
Competitors at the 2019 Winter Universiade
People from Huddinge Municipality
Competitors at the 2017 Winter Universiade